People's Revolutionary Army may refer to:

People's Revolutionary Army (Argentina)
People's Revolutionary Army (Colombia)
People's Revolutionary Army (El Salvador)
Popular Revolutionary Army (Mexico)
People's Revolutionary Army (Grenada)
National Revolutionary Army (China)
Ukrainian People's Revolutionary Army
Zimbabwe People's Revolutionary Army

See also
People's Army (disambiguation)
People's Liberation Army (disambiguation)
Revolutionary Armed Forces